The International Centre for Migration Policy Development (ICMPD) is an international organisation with operations spread over 90 countries worldwide. It was established by Austria and Switzerland in 1993 and has since grown to 19 member states as of 2022. ICMPD was founded to carry out research, projects and activities on migration-related issues and to provide policy recommendations to the governmental agencies of states, as well as to external governmental and intergovernmental agencies. ICMPD also has observer status at the United Nations. Although ICMPD has global operations, it is primarily focused on the European area and is headquartered in Vienna, Austria. ICMPD is currently composed of 19 Member States, around 470 staff members, a mission in Brussels, regional offices in Ankara and Malta, as well as Project offices in Africa, Central Asia, Middle East and South Asia.

Purpose 
ICMPD cooperates with governments, other international organisations, research institutes and members of civil society in developing policies in migration-related areas, as well organising trainings, etc. to transfer know-how on dealing with migration issues. The purpose of ICMPD is to promote innovative, comprehensive and sustainable migration policies and to function as a service exchange mechanism for governments and organisations.

ICMPD has vast experience in bridging the gap between theory and practice. According to that ICMPD provides policy makers and politicians with necessary groundwork to take decisions. Furthermore, ICMPD is present on the ground, with its capacity building activities in various areas of migration management.

Mission Statement - Making Migration Better 
Making migration and mobility of people orderly, safe and regular, including through the implementation of planned and well managed migration policies.

Organisational structure 
Office of the Director General, Director General Michael Spindelegger 

 Secretariat
 Communications
 Directorate for Policy, Research and Strategy
 Directorate Migration Dialogues and Cooperation 
 Brussels Mission 
 People Management and Organisational Development
 Corporate Financial Management

Policy, Research & Strategy (PRS), Director, and Deputy Director General Lukas Gehrke

 External and Member States Relations
 Member States Programme
 Policy Unit
 Research
 Strategy
 Knowledge Management

Resources and Operations Management (ROM), Director Angiolo Rolli

 Corporate Resources Management
 Management Systems Support
 Information and Communications Technology

Migration Dialogues and Cooperation (MDC), Director Martijn Pluim

 Programmes and Project Development
 Western Balkans and Turkey
 Eastern Europe and Central Asia
 Silk Routes
 Mediterranean
 Africa

Brussels Mission, Head of Mission Ralph Genetzke

 Policy and Strategic Partnerships
 Global Initiatives
 Resource Management

Member states 

After its founding in 1993 by Austria and Switzerland, it was joined in 1995 by Hungary and then in 1998 by Slovenia.  The Czech Republic became a member in 2001, followed by Portugal and Sweden in 2002, Bulgaria and Poland in 2003, Croatia in 2004, Slovakia in 2006, Romania in 2010, Bosnia and Herzegovina and Serbia in 2011, and the Republic of North Macedonia in 2012. Malta and Turkey, both joined in 2018. The newest member is Germany 2020.

Director Generals 
Jonas Widgren (1993–2004)
Gottfried Zürcher (2004–2009)
Peter Widermann (2010–2014)
Gabriela Abado (Acting Director General, 2015)
Michael Spindelegger (2016–present)

References

External links 
ICMPD research

Human migration
Organizations established in 1993